The Kurdistan Conservative Party is led by Najat Surchi. The List represents tribal leaders and is dominated by the Surchi family. On 16 June 1996 KDP forces clashed with fighters from the Surchi family's home villages, killing Hussein Surchi, Zaid's uncle. The PUK supported the Conservative Party during the short-lived conflict. The Surchi tribe is found in Erbil, Duhok and Mosul. For the 2009 Iraqi Kurdistan legislative election, the Kurdistan Conservative Party List was given the electoral lot number 61.

References

Conservative parties in Iraq
Kurdish political parties in Iraq
Political parties in Kurdistan Region
Rebel groups in Iraq